Krasnopillia may refer to:

 Krasnopillia (town), a town in Sumy Oblast, Ukraine
 , a village in the Donetsk Raion of the Donetsk Oblast, Ukraine, and the site of the Battle of Krasnopillia